Segol Mann (19 July 1918 – 23 November 1992) was a Swedish film actor. He appeared in more than 40 films between 1943 and 1984.

Filmography

 Två solkiga blondiner (1984)
 Nattens lekar (1978)
 The Stone Face (1972)
 Magnetisören (1972)
 The Lie (1970)
 Eva - den utstötta (1969)
 Bandet (1964)
 Misantropen (1963)
 Handen på hjärtat (1962)
 Briggen Tre Liljor (1961)
 Stöten (1961)
 Sången om den eldröda blomman (1956)
 Krut och kärlek (1956)
 Wild Birds (1955)
 Seger i mörker (1954)
 Vägen till Klockrike (1953)
 Barabbas (1953)
 Defiance (1952)
 This Can't Happen Here (1950)
 Prison (1949)
 Banketten (1948)
 Music in Darkness (1948)
 Neglected by His Wife (1947)
 The Journey Away (1945)
 Gagmannen (1945)
 The Rose of Tistelön (1945)
 Man's Woman (1945)
 Dens osyniga muren (1944)
 Night in the Harbor (1943)
 There's a Fire Burning (1943)

References

External links

1918 births
1992 deaths
Swedish male film actors
20th-century Swedish male actors